The San Diego Bay Wine & Food Festival is an international showcase of wine and spirits, chefs and culinary personalities, and gourmet foods, produced by World of Wine Events, LLC. Attendees able to take cooking classes, sample food from celebrity chefs and local restaurants, and participate in wine tastings from 170 wineries, breweries and spirit booths. The festival takes place in November and has been held annually since 2004, except 2020 (see details below).

History 
The San Diego Bay Wine & Food Festival was created in 2004 by co-producers Ken Loyst and Michelle Metter. Proceeds from the auctions benefit the American Institute of Wine & Food Culinary Arts Scholarship programs for students in San Diego.

2020 caused the 17th annual festival to be deferred to 2021 on grounds of COVID-19 pandemic.

Production
The San Diego Bay Wine & Food Festival is produced by World of Wine Events and Fast Forward Event Productions, an event management and festival production company specializing in the creation of wine, culinary trade, and consumer events.

References

External links
Official San Diego Bay Wine & Food Festival website
San Diego Wine & Food Festival organizer Michelle Metter on Mystery Meet's Find Dining Podcast

Food and drink festivals in the United States
Festivals in San Diego
Wine festivals in the United States